Olaf Kaska (born 15 January 1973) is a German coxswain. He won a gold medal at the 1998 World Rowing Championships in Cologne with the lightweight men's eight.

References

1973 births
Living people
German male rowers
World Rowing Championships medalists for Germany
Coxswains (rowing)